Sean Romans (born 27 July 1985 in Christchurch, New Zealand) is a retired rugby union player who played at scrum-half for Nottingham. He previously played for the Highlanders and Otago.

Playing career

Provincial Rugby

Romans made his debut for Otago in the 2007 Air New Zealand Cup and emerged as a regular for the 2008 Air New Zealand Cup. For the 2009 Air New Zealand Cup, Romans was named vice-captain of the squad.

Romans is a second-generation member of the Otago side, following in the footsteps of his father Mark.

Super Rugby

On the back of his showings for Otago in the Air New Zealand Cup, Romans earned a contract with the Highlanders for the 2009 Super 14 season to serve as a backup to team captain and All Black Jimmy Cowan.

International Play

Romans was selected for the Junior All Blacks for the 2009 IRB Pacific Nations Cup, where he came on as a substitute against Samoa and started in a 52-21 victory over Japan.

References

External links
Highlanders profile

Living people
New Zealand rugby union players
Highlanders (rugby union) players
Otago rugby union players
Nottingham R.F.C. players
New Zealand expatriate rugby union players
New Zealand expatriate sportspeople in England
Expatriate rugby union players in England
1985 births
Rugby union players from Christchurch
Rugby union scrum-halves